The following is a list of mountains in Daozhen Gelao and Miao Autonomous County, Guizhou, China:

List

References

 

Mountains of Guizhou
Geography of Daozhen Gelao and Miao Autonomous County